Alcabalusa, Allqa Walusa or Allqawalusa (Aymara and Quechua allqa multicolored, black and white or two-colored, walusa, wallusa a watery kind of potatoes, Hispanicized spelling Alcabalusa) is a mountain in the Wansu mountain range in the Andes of Peru, about  high. It is situated in the Apurímac Region, Antabamba Province, Oropesa District, and in the Arequipa Region, La Unión Province, Huaynacotas District.

See also 
 Lunq'u
 Llamuqa

References 

Mountains of Peru
Mountains of Apurímac Region
Mountains of Arequipa Region